Eugeni Asensio (born 1937) is a Spanish water polo sports official best known for taking the Judge's Oath at the 1992 Summer Olympics in Barcelona.

See also
 Spain men's Olympic water polo team records and statistics

References
IOC 1992 Summer Olympics
Wendl, Karel. "The Olympic Oath - A Brief History" Citius, Altius, Fortius (Journal of Olympic History since 1997). Winter 1995. pp. 4,5.

External links
 

Living people
Spanish male water polo players
Spanish water polo officials
Olympic officials
Oath takers at the Olympic Games
1937 births
20th-century Spanish people